Matthew Villanueva (born July 4, 1987) is an American professional boxer of Cuban and Puerto Rican descent.

Amateur career
During his amateur career he had a record of 34-6. Matthew was a two-time California Police Athletic League Champion and won the Desert Showdown Championships.

Pro career
On January 28, 2011 Villanueva beat veteran Jose Luis Cardenas. The bout was televised on ESPN's Friday Night Fights.

References

External links

American boxers of Cuban descent
American sportspeople of Puerto Rican descent
Boxers from California
Super-flyweight boxers
1987 births
Living people
American male boxers